Anjum Saeed (born 11 August 1968) is a Pakistani field hockey player. He won a bronze medal at the 1992 Summer Olympics in Barcelona.

References

External links
 

1968 births
Living people
Pakistani male field hockey players
Olympic field hockey players of Pakistan
Field hockey players at the 1992 Summer Olympics
Olympic bronze medalists for Pakistan
Olympic medalists in field hockey
Medalists at the 1992 Summer Olympics
Field hockey players at the 1990 Asian Games
Asian Games medalists in field hockey
Asian Games gold medalists for Pakistan
Medalists at the 1990 Asian Games
1990 Men's Hockey World Cup players
20th-century Pakistani people